Ayyub ibn Shurahbil was the governor of Egypt during the reign of the Umayyad Caliph Umar II (717–720).

On his accession in 717, Umar asked his advisors to name the most suitable men from the Arab settlers (jund) of Egypt so that he could choose one of them as the province's new governor; Ayyub was one of the two men named, and finally appointed to the post. His period of office was marked by Umar's piety-driven reforms, aimed at supporting the Muslims and spreading Islamization across the Caliphate: although the privileges of the Christian Church and the monasteries were confirmed, Christian village headsmen were replaced by Muslims, the sale of wine was prohibited, the jizya became universally enforced, and the pressure to convert to Islam increased.

References

Sources 
 

7th-century births
8th-century deaths
8th-century Umayyad governors of Egypt
Umayyad governors of Egypt
7th-century Arabs
8th-century Arabs